Henry O'Grady (16 March 1907 – 12 April 1990) was an English footballer who played at inside forward for Nantwich, Witton Albion, Port Vale, Southampton, Leeds United, Burnley, Bury, Millwall, Carlisle United, Accrington Stanley, and Tunbridge Wells Rangers. Never spending more than two seasons at any one club, he made 99 league appearances playing in every division of the Football League between 1930 and 1938.

Career
O'Grady played for Cheshire County League sides Nantwich and Witton Albion, before joining Port Vale in November 1929. He made his debut playing at right-half in a 3–0 win over Wigan Borough at Springfield Park on 25 January 1930; this was his only appearance of the 1929–30 Third Division North winning campaign. He did not feature at The Old Recreation Ground in the 1930–31 season, and left the "Valiants" in the summer.

He moved on to Second Division side Southampton in August 1931. He scored on his "Saints" debut in a 3–0 victory over Burnley at Turf Moor on 29 August. Despite this, he spent most of his one season at The Dell in the reserves, making occasional first-team appearances as replacement for Bill Fraser at inside-right or Arthur Wilson at inside-left. At the end of the 1931–32 season, having made only seven first-team appearances (scoring twice) he was offered the chance to move to Leeds.

He joined Leeds United in August 1932, but with Arthur Hydes established at number eight, he again found first-team opportunities limited. He scored twice in eight First Division games for Leeds in 1932–33. After a year at Elland Road, he drop back down into the Second Division to play for Burnley in 1933–34. Despite a record of eight goals in only 13 league games, he was allowed to switch to league rivals Bury in 1934–35. He hit four goals in 15 appearances for the "Shakers", before leaving Gigg Lane for Millwall. He appeared in just four Third Division South games for the "Lions" in 1935–36. He then scored nine goals in 28 Third Division North appearances for Carlisle United in 1936–37. He switched to league rivals Accrington Stanley in 1937–38, and scored twice in 23 fixtures at Peel Park. He later ended his career in the Southern League with Tunbridge Wells Rangers.

Career statistics
Source:

Honours
Port Vale
 Football League Third Division North: 1929–30

References

People from Tunstall, Staffordshire
Footballers from Stoke-on-Trent
English footballers
Association football midfielders
Nantwich Town F.C. players
Witton Albion F.C. players
Port Vale F.C. players
Southampton F.C. players
Leeds United F.C. players
Burnley F.C. players
Bury F.C. players
Millwall F.C. players
Carlisle United F.C. players
Accrington Stanley F.C. (1891) players
Tunbridge Wells F.C. players
English Football League players
Southern Football League players
1907 births
1990 deaths